Thomas Noble (1656 – 3 May 1730) was a British politician.

Born around 1698, Noble was the eldest son of Thomas Noble of Rearsby, an alderman of Leicester. He was elected a tory Member of Parliament for Leicester in a by-election on 3 February 1719, and served until the general election of 1722. He did not stand for parliament again.

Noble married twice, firstly to Mary Harvey before 1693, with whom he had a son and a daughter. On 13 October 1702 he married Mary Keyt, daughter of Sir William Keyt, 2nd Baronet and sister of the 3rd baronet. The second marriage was childless. Noble died on 3 May 1730.

References

 

1656 births
1730 deaths
Members of the Parliament of Great Britain for English constituencies
British MPs 1715–1722